Maneesh Sharma is an Indian film director, producer and screenwriter who works in Hindi cinema.

Early life and education
Born and raised in Delhi, where he lived in various parts of the city, including Pitam Pura, Maneesh did his schooling at Delhi Public School, R K Puram. Then he received a degree in English literature from Hans Raj College, Delhi University. At college, he was involved in the theatre society and shot his debut film in 2010 there. After his graduation he moved to California to study filmmaking at CalArts. Before moving to Mumbai, he was also involved in theatre in Delhi and was a dancer in a local musical troupe.

Career
While studying filmmaking at CalArts, Maneesh worked as an associate director on Trona (2004), an English-German student film shot in Los Angeles.

Two months after his return from the US, he got a break and started his Bollywood career as an associate director and an assistant director on a number of Yash Raj Films productions such as Fanaa, Aaja Nachle and Rab Ne Bana Di Jodi, before making his feature directing debut with Band Baaja Baaraat (English title: Bands Horns and Revelry), based on a story written by himself, which was released on 10 December 2010. The film starred newcomer Ranveer Singh and Anushka Sharma in the lead roles, and was produced by Aditya Chopra under the Yash Raj Films banner. Sharma's first outing as a director garnered him a Filmfare Award in the Best Debut Director category.

His next film, Ladies vs Ricky Bahl, was produced by Aditya Chopra and released on 9 December 2011. The critically acclaimed film starred Ranveer Singh and Anushka Sharma, who were also in Sharma's first film. Sharma's third film, Shuddh Desi Romance (English title: A Purely Desi Romance), released on 6 September 2013, and starred Sushant Singh Rajput, Parineeti Chopra, and newcomer Vaani Kapoor in the lead roles. The film was screened in the Gala Presentation section of the 2013 Toronto International Film Festival.

Maneesh Sharma's fourth film is Dum Laga Ke Haisha under the YRF Banner. Yash Raj Films has always had either Yash Chopra or Aditya Chopra produce movies under the banner, but Sharma is first independent producer. The film is directed by Sharat Katariya, and stars Ayushmann Khurrana. His next directorial venture is movie Fan, with lead star Shah Rukh Khan. Sharma's second production is Akshay Roy's debut film Meri Pyaari Bindu starring Parineeti Chopra and Ayushmann Khurrana. Maneesh Sharma has stepped in as the director for the third film in the Tiger series.

Filmography

Awards and nominations

References

External links
 
 Maneesh Sharma at Bollywood Hungama

Living people
Film directors from Delhi
Hindi-language film directors
Delhi University alumni
Filmfare Awards winners
California Institute of the Arts alumni
Year of birth missing (living people)
21st-century Indian film directors